Send No More Roses is a 1977 novel by Eric Ambler. It was published in the United States as The Siege of the Villa Lipp.

Plot
Criminologist Professor Frits Krom visits Paul Firman, alias Oberholzer, a crooked investor. Firman agrees to be interviewed at his villa on the French Riviera. They come under attack by Firman's former business partner, Mat Tuakana.

Reception
It is regarded as one of Ambler's late masterpieces.

Kirkus Reviews wrote "You can be sure that Eric Ambler would never mix his metaphors, write an ungraceful line, or tell you a story you don't want to hear."

References

English thriller novels
1977 British novels
Novels by Eric Ambler
Weidenfeld & Nicolson books